Kati Thanda-Lake Eyre National Park (formerly Lake Eyre National Park) is a protected area in the Australian state of South Australia. It is located 697 km north of the state capital of Adelaide within the gazetted locality of Lake Eyre. It contains both the North and South sections of Lake Eyre as well as sections of the Tirari Desert.

The national park protects dry desert landscapes, the nation's largest salt lake and the lowest point on the mainland. As of 2012, the national park has been subject to a co-management agreement between the Arabana aboriginal people and the Department of Environment, Water and Natural Resources (DEWNR). The national park almost encloses Elliot Price Conservation Park, which covers the Hunt Peninsula and Brooks Island, within and around the northern section of the lake. It was established as South Australia's first arid zone conservation zone. It was named after Elliot Price, from the nearby Muloorina Station. There is limited vehicle access to the park.

The national park was renamed as Kati Thanda-Lake Eyre National Park on 14 November 2013.

The national park is classified as an IUCN Category VI protected area.

See also

 Protected areas of South Australia
 Lake Eyre Basin

References

External links
 Kati Thanda-Lake Eyre National Park official webpage
Entry for Kati Thanda-Lake Eyre National Park on Protected Planet

National parks of South Australia
Far North (South Australia)
Lake Eyre basin
Protected areas established in 1985
1985 establishments in Australia
Co-managed protected areas in South Australia